Joel Douglas Hubbard (November 6, 1860 – May 26, 1919) was a U.S. Representative from Missouri.

Born near Marshall, Missouri, Hubbard attended the public schools and Central College, Fayette, Missouri.
He graduated from the Missouri Medical College at St. Louis in 1882 and practiced medicine in Syracuse, Missouri until 1886.
Hubbard was a County clerk from 1886-1894.

Hubbard was elected as a Republican to the Fifty-fourth Congress (March 4, 1895 – March 4, 1897).
However, he was an unsuccessful candidate for reelection in 1896 to the Fifty-fifth Congress.
Having studied law Hubbard was admitted to the Missouri bar in 1899 and commenced practice in Versailles, Missouri.
He also engaged in the banking business.
He practiced medicine in Sedalia, Missouri, in 1904 and 1905.
He returned to Versailles and resumed the practice of law and his banking interests.
He moved to El Paso, Texas, in 1917 and continued the practice of law.
He died in Tampa, Florida, on May 26, 1919.
He was interred in Versailles Cemetery, Versailles, Missouri.

References

1860 births
1919 deaths
Republican Party members of the United States House of Representatives from Missouri
19th-century American politicians
People from Marshall, Missouri
People from Versailles, Missouri